Abuja Gateway Consortium (AGC) is a consortium that manages Nnamdi Azikiwe International Airport in Nigeria. It was created by Airline Services Limited (ASL) Nigeria, Asset and Resource Management (ARM) Nigeria, NairaNet Technologies Limited A.G. Nigeria, A.G. Ferrero Ltd. Nigeria and Airport Consulting Vienna GmbH (ACV) Austria.

History 
Abuja was awarded to AGC on November 13, 2006, under a Public-Private Partnership arrangement. The consortium's bid included investments of about USD 371 million, out of which USD 50 million were deployed in the first five years.

The contract was terminated in April 2008.

References

External links
Nnamdi Azikiwe International Airport

Aviation in Nigeria
Economy of Nigeria